Momčilo "Momo" Kapor (8 April 1937 – 3 March 2010) was a Serbian novelist and painter.

He authored several screenplays, over forty novels, short stories, travel and autobiographic books and essays. He was introduced to the literary circles as the author of radio, TV and theater drama at the beginning of the sixties. His books have been translated to twenty languages. The shorts stories collection Kinoteka at three and novels The Green Felt of Montenegro and The Last Flight to Sarajevo were published in French by L'Age d'homme in Lausanne while The Mastery of Šlomović was published by Xenie in Vevey.

His paintings were exhibited in New York, Boston, Geneva, Frankfurt, London and other cities. He was also known as an illustrator, illustrating his own and numerous books by other authors. He was a regular member of the Academy of Sciences and Arts of Republika Srpska.

Early life
Kapor was born in 1937 in Sarajevo, Drina Banovina, Kingdom of Yugoslavia. His father, Gojko Kapor, was a bank clerk, and his mother, Bojana was a housewife. In 1941, during World War II, a bomb fell on the home in which Kapor, his grandmother, and his mother were taking refuge. Kapor's mother used her body as a shield and, although she was killed, Kapor was able to survive. He reflected back on that day, remembering that even the little cat, which he held in his arms, died. Kapor knew very little about his mother since not much was said in his family. Immediately following World War II, Kapor moved with his family to Belgrade, Serbia where he remained for most of his life.

Education
As a young man, Kapor studied painting at the Academy of Art in Belgrade under the guidance of Professor Nedeljko Gvozdenović. Although Kapor graduated with a degree in painting, he had grown fond of writing as a young boy. Therefore, while studying art he also occupied his time with news writing. Kapor would write news articles and interviews and then accompany his writing with his own representative portrait or illustration. It is through this method that Kapor was able to combine his two greatest passions he had in life, painting and writing.

Literary works
Kapor is one of the most popular Serbian writers, whose literary phenomenon has spread over three decades. Kapor easily attracted the attention of the public by writing his constant reflections on the reality of the current time. The generations of people from former Yugoslavia were connected through Kapor's writings which have become best sellers in Zagreb's publisher "Znanje" and its famous library "Hit".

Kapor also wrote many documentary films, television shows, and novels. His novels, "Una" and "The Book of Complaints" were made into films. These films have been translated into many languages including: French, German, Polish, Czech, Bulgarian, Hungarian, Slovenian, and Swedish. His most famous works include, "Ada", "Zoe", "From Seven to Three", and "The Chronicle of a Lost City".

Artwork
Kapor has exhibited many of his paintings across various countries such as in the United States, Germany, and France. The reason he preferred to showcase his artwork in foreign countries rather than in Belgrade was that he did not enjoy the "art climate" set in Belgrade. He felt that many great artists in Belgrade were forgotten, whereas in other countries, a new emerging artist does not "erase" those who came before him/her.

Death
After having two surgeries, Kapor died from throat cancer on 3 March 2010.

Works

Foliranti, 1975
Provincijalac, 1976
Ada, 1977
Lanjski snegovi, 1977
Hej, nisam ti to pričala, 1978
Zoe, 1978
Beleške jedne Ane (hronika u 26 glava), 1978
Skitam i pričam: putopisni dnevnik, 1979
101 priča, 1980
Una: ljubavni roman, 1981
Onda, 1982
Sentimentalno vaspitanje, 1983
Knjiga žalbi, 1984
011-Istok-Zapad, 1990
Halo, Beograd, 1990
Dama skitnica i off priče, 1992
Zelena čoja Montenegra, 1992
Blokada 011, 1992
100 nedelja blokade, 1994
Lero – kralj leptira, 1995
Poslednji let za Sarajevo, 1995
Hronika izgubljenog grada, 1996
Od sedam do tri, 1996
Smrt ne boli: priče iz poslednjeg rata, 1997
Najbolje godine i druge priče, 1997
Ivana, 2001
Od istog pisca, 2001
Legenda o Taboru, 2002
Sanja, 2003
Čuvar adrese
Dosije Šlomović
Konte
Lep dan za umiranje
Ljubavne priče
Samac
Uspomene jednog crtača
Eldorado
Putopis kroz biografiju

References

External links

 
 
 

1937 births
2010 deaths
Writers from Sarajevo
Serbs of Bosnia and Herzegovina
Artists from Sarajevo
Serbian painters
Writers who illustrated their own writing
Members of the Academy of Sciences and Arts of the Republika Srpska
Deaths from cancer in Serbia
Deaths from throat cancer
Burials at Belgrade New Cemetery